Five Points Historic District may refer to:

in the United States
(by state)
Five Points South Historic District, Birmingham, Alabama, listed on the NRHP in Alabama
 Five Points Historic District (Huntsville, Alabama)
Five Points Historic District (Albemarle, North Carolina), listed on the NRHP in North Carolina
Five Points Historic Neighborhoods (Raleigh, North Carolina)
Five Points Historic District (Columbia, South Carolina), NRHP-listed in Columbia